Gonamena is a site of disused mines in Cornwall, England. It is half a mile south of Minions.

See also

References

History of Cornwall
Mines in Cornwall
Tin mines in Cornwall